Leon Aiden Osborne (born 28 October 1989) is an English professional footballer playing for Pickering Town. He played in the Football League with Bradford City. His preferred position is winger.

Career

Bradford City
Born in Doncaster, Osborne made his league debut for Bradford City when he came on as substitute in the final 10 minutes of City's 2–2 draw with Millwall in the final game of the 2006–07 season.

Although still predominantly a member of the youth set-up at the Bantams, Osborne caused controversy when he insulted the club on his Bebo page. Osborne subsequently apologised for his misdemeanor and was reprimanded by the club and manager Stuart McCall, and remained at the club. McCall later said: "Leon's not a bad lad but just a bit of a kid at times. We all do silly things and he just needed to mature."

He did not play for the first team during the 2007–08 season, but was offered a new contract, and signed until the end of the year in May 2008. He earned a place on the bench for several games during the first few months of the 2008–09 season but did not make an appearance, until his first senior start for an FA Cup first-round game at Milton Keynes Dons in November 2008. His first league start came two weeks later in a 2–0 win against Rotherham United at the Don Valley Stadium when he was substituted during the second half.

Southport (loan)
He joined Southport on loan in August 2011.

Harrogate Town
After his release from Bradford he signed for Harrogate Town in August 2012.

Stalybridge Celtic
He then signed for Stalybridge Celtic.

Buxton
In the summer of 2013, he joined Buxton.

Goole
In December 2013 he played one match for Goole.

Frickley Athletic
After the game for Goole he moved to Frickley Athletic.

Matlock Town
He then joined Matlock Town

Rainworth Miners Welfare
He then had a spell at Rainworth Miners Welfare.

Farsley Celtic
In August he moved again, this time to Farsley Celtic.

Long Eaton
In June 2016 he joined Long Eaton United but did not remain at the club for long over the pre-season period.

Bradford Park Avenue
In summer 2016, after playing in virtually all of the club's pre-season matches as a trialist, he joined Bradford Park Avenue.

Brighouse Town
He then joined Brighouse Town at the end of September.

Hyde United
In March 2017 he joined Hyde United.

Scarborough Athletic
In May 2017 he joined Scarborough Athletic.

Pickering Town
Joined Pickering July 2020

References

External links
 Bradford City profile
 

1989 births
Living people
Footballers from Doncaster
English footballers
Association football forwards
Bradford City A.F.C. players
Southport F.C. players
English Football League players
Harrogate Town A.F.C. players
Stalybridge Celtic F.C. players
Goole A.F.C. players
Buxton F.C. players
Frickley Athletic F.C. players
Matlock Town F.C. players
Rainworth Miners Welfare F.C. players
Farsley Celtic A.F.C. players
Bradford (Park Avenue) A.F.C. players
Association football midfielders
Hyde United F.C. players
Brighouse Town F.C. players
Scarborough Athletic F.C. players
Long Eaton United F.C. players